The Hoopes process is a metallurgical process, used to obtain the aluminium metal of very high  purity(about 99.9% pure). The process was patented by William Hoopes, a chemist of the Aluminum Company of America (ALCOA) in 1925.

Introduction
It is a method used to obtain aluminium of very high purity. The metal obtained in the Hall–Héroult process is about 99% pure, and for most purposes it is taken as pure metal.
However, further purification of aluminium can be carried out by the Hoopes process. This is an electrolytic process.

The process
The cell used in this process consists of an iron tank lined with carbon at the bottom.
A molten alloy of copper, crude aluminium and silicon is used as the anode. It forms the lowermost layer in the cell.
The middle layer consists of molten mixture of fluorides of sodium, aluminium and barium (cryolite + BaF2).
The uppermost layer consists of molten aluminium.
A set of graphite rods dipped in molten aluminium serve as the cathode.
During electrolysis, Al3+ ions from the middle layer migrate to the upper layer, where they are reduced to aluminum by gaining 3 electrons.
Equal numbers of Al3+ ions are produced in the lower layer. These ions migrate to the middle layer. Pure aluminium is tapped off from time to time. The Hoopes process gives about 99.99% pure aluminium.

References

Further reading

Aluminium
Metallurgical processes